29th U-boat Flotilla ("29. Unterseebootsflottille") was formed in December 1941 in La Spezia in Italy under the command of Korvettenkapitän Franz Becker. The flotilla operated mostly various marks of the Type VII U-boat and it concentrated its efforts mainly in the Mediterranean Sea, against convoys. In August 1943, the flotilla moved to Toulon, but did also have U-boats in Marseille and Salamis.

Flotilla commanders

U-boats assigned to the flotilla

References 

 
 

29
Military units and formations established in 1941
Military units and formations established in 1944
La Spezia